Jabbar Rashak (1 July 1942 – 9 October 2015) was a former Iraqi football defender who played for Iraq in 1966. He played in the 1966 Arab Nations Cup.

On 9 October 2015, Rashak died at the age of 73.

References

Iraqi footballers
Iraq international footballers
2015 deaths
Association football defenders

1942 births